The S&P 1000 is an index maintained by S&P Dow Jones Indices, a combination of both the mid-cap S&P 400 and small-cap S&P 600 index. The lists of companies within each component may be found at:

 List of S&P 400 companies and
 List of S&P 600 companies

References

American stock market indices
Lists of companies
S&P Dow Jones Indices